Mitarai (written: 御手洗) is a Japanese surname. Notable people with the surname include:

, Japanese businessman
, Japanese murder victim
, Japanese businessman

Fictional Characters: 

Japanese-language surnames